Sarnakhpyur (also, Sarnakhbyur) is a town in the Gegharkunik Province of Armenia.

References 
Populated places in Gegharkunik Province